The River Lossie is a river in north east Scotland. It enters the sea at Lossiemouth on the Moray Firth. By the time it moves through Elgin its rate of flow, in normal conditions, is best described as very slow.

Name and etymology 
The hydronym Lossie was recorded either as Loscyn or Lostyn in 1189, and may be of Pictish origin. The ending -yn represents -in, a Pictish form of the Welsh suffix yn. The first element may be a cognate either of Welsh llost meaning "tail, spear", or llosg meaning "burning".

The Lossie has been identified with the Loksa recorded by Ptolemy, although River Findhorn is a more likely candidate for such identification.

Settlements
(from south to north)
 Dallas
 Kellas
 Paddockhaugh
 Pittendreich
 Elgin
 Calcots
 Lossiemouth (East Beach Bridge)

References

Lossie
0Lossie